Marvin Larry Benard (born January 20, 1970) is a Nicaraguan former professional baseball outfielder. He played in Major League Baseball (MLB) for the San Francisco Giants.

Personal life

Benard moved to Los Angeles with his mother and father when he was 12. After a stellar prep career at Bell High School, he attended El Camino College (Torrance, CA) freshman year. After his Head Coach Tom Hicks stepped down, Benard transferred to L.A. Harbor Junior College in Wilmington, Calif., then Lewis-Clark State College in Lewiston, Idaho. His cousin, Maurice Benard, is a soap opera actor.

His son, Isaac, was drafted by the Tampa Bay Rays in the 23rd round of the 2016 Amateur Draft and was a member of the Princeton Rays in the Appalachian League, where he hit .255 with 3 home runs and 3 stolen bases in 110 at-bats.

Major League career

Benard played with the San Francisco Giants from 1995 to 2003. He was a starter from 1999–2001, and played most of the 1996 season due to an injury to Glenallen Hill. He won the 1999 Willie Mac Award for his spirit and leadership. Despite a disappointing postseason performance in 2000, Marvin had one of the most memorable hits of series, driving in Ellis Burks with an RBI single in Game 3 of the 2000 National League Division Series.

Benard had above-average power for a leadoff hitter.  A notorious first-pitch hitter prone to striking out, Benard had good bat speed and could steal bases, though he was caught stealing 29% of the time over the course of his career. He played all three outfield positions, mostly as a center fielder. As a pinch hitter, he had a career .267 batting average.  Benard hit the final San Francisco Giants home run in the history of Candlestick Park, which came in the first inning of the Giants' eventual 9-4 loss to the Los Angeles Dodgers.

After becoming a free agent after the 2003 season, Benard agreed to a minor-league contract with the Chicago White Sox but was released before the season began and signed with the Toronto Blue Jays. He was released after one season with the Triple-A Syracuse Chiefs, hitting .211 with four homers and 18 RBI in 33 games.

Post-retirement
On April 11, 2010, Benard admitted to using steroids during the 2002 season in which the Giants reached the World Series.

Benard was employed as a hitting coach for the San Diego Padres' short-season Class A Northwest League affiliate, the Tri-City Dust Devils, for the 2015 season. In 2016 he managed the Nicaragua national baseball team. He is currently employed as a color commentator for the Giants' Spanish-language radio broadcasts, working road games alongside Erwin Higueros.

See also
List of Major League Baseball players named in the Mitchell Report

References

External links

Pura Pelota (Venezuelan Winter League)

1970 births
Living people
Atlantic City Surf players
Clinton Giants players
Everett Giants players
Fresno Grizzlies players
Lewis–Clark State Warriors baseball players
Los Angeles Harbor Seahawks baseball players
Major League Baseball broadcasters
Major League Baseball outfielders
Major League Baseball players from Nicaragua
Minor league baseball coaches
Navegantes del Magallanes players
Nicaraguan expatriate baseball players in Venezuela
Nicaraguan emigrants to the United States
People from Bluefields
Phoenix Firebirds players
San Francisco Giants announcers
San Francisco Giants players
San Jose Giants players
Shreveport Captains players
Baseball players from Los Angeles
Syracuse SkyChiefs players
Tiburones de La Guaira players
Baseball coaches from California
Mat-Su Miners players